Alniphagus is a genus of crenulate bark beetles in the family Curculionidae. There are about eight described species in Alniphagus.

Species
These eight species belong to the genus Alniphagus:
 Alniphagus africanus Schedl, 1963h
 Alniphagus alni Wood & Bright, 1992
 Alniphagus aspericollis (LeConte, 1876) (alder bark beetle)
 Alniphagus costatus Mandelshtam, Petrov & Barclay, 2008
 Alniphagus hirsutus Schedl, 1949
 Alniphagus imitator Sokanovskii & B.V., 1958
 Alniphagus padus Beeson, 1961
 Alniphagus scutulatus Schedl, 1963

References

Further reading

 
 
 

Scolytinae
Articles created by Qbugbot